TVQ is the Brisbane television station of Network 10 in Australia.

History
In April 1964, the Postmaster-General's Department granted Universal Telecasters a broadcasting licence. The channel was allocated channel 0 (the 0 was pronounced as the letter O instead of "zero") on the VHF band and commenced broadcasting on 1 July 1965 as TVQ-0. Ansett Transport Industries initially held a 49% shareholding, before acquiring the remaining shares in 1970.

After News Limited acquired a controlling stake in Ansett, it was required to sell TVQ due to restrictions on the number of television stations one organisation could own. TVQ was sold to Ampol (67%) and 2SM (33%). In 1984 TVQ was purchased by Qintex.

On 10 September 1988, Toowoomba station DDQ-10 switched frequency to DDQ-0, and TVQ-0 also changed frequency to become TVQ-10, in time for the channel's broadcast of the 1988 Summer Olympics, at the same time as its broadcasts of World Expo 88, of which it and the entire Network Ten was the official station.

On 30 November 2015, lightning struck the TVQ transmission tower, cutting its power and lighting.

Digital multiplex

Programming

Current in-house productions
 Gamify (2019–present)
 Shake Takes (2020–present)

Past productions
 Scope (2005–2020)
 Toasted TV (2005–2020)
 10 News First Queensland (1965–2020)
 Crocamole (2016–2019)
 Couch Time (2011–2017)
 Wurrawhy (2011–2016)
 Puzzle Play (2006–2011)
 ttn (2004–2008)
 In the Box (1998–2006)
 Ocean Girl (1994–1997)
 Totally Wild (1992–2021)
 Jacki Mac Breakfast Show (1980)
 Have A Go Show (1980)
 The Saturday Show (1967–1970s)
Fat Cat and Friends 
 Funville (1966-1970s)
 Just A Minute (1987)
 This Week at Expo (1988)
 Newsmakers
 Brisbane With Anna McMahon (1990)
 Living (1980s)
 Early Birds (1980s)
 Countdown (1960s)
 Frightful Movies with Deadly Earnest (1967–1968)

News and current affairs

TVQ-10 produces a 90-minute local news program at 5pm on weeknights.

10 News First is presented from the network's Sydney studios by Sandra Sully with sports presenter Matt Burke and weather presenter Josh Holt. Reporters, camera crews and editorial staff are based at TVQ-10's Mount Coot-tha studios and a Gold Coast news bureau at Surfers Paradise.

TVQ-0 did not operate a news service until 1974 when it launched News Watch. The bulletin later adopted the branding Eyewitness News after rival channel BTQ-7 had relinquished the name, and became the first Brisbane newscast to use videotape for its reports. Eyewitness News continued as a nightly half-hour bulletin until 1984 when it was expanded to a one-hour format (the last Network Ten station at that time to convert to the one hour newscast used in other major Australian cities save for Perth). The station won a Logie award in 1986 for Best News Report for its coverage of the siege at Eagle Farm Airport the previous year.

With TVQ as the host broadcaster for World Expo 88, Eyewitness News shifted its newsroom operation and production to the TVQ stand at the Expo site, putting itself on show to the general public for the entire six-month duration of Expo. After the close of Expo on 30 October 1988, the newsroom returned to the Mount Coot-tha studios to a refurbished news set and a branding refresh to Ten News (acknowledging the channel's transition from VHF Channel 0 to 10 and bringing TVQ into line with Network Ten stations in other states).

The Eyewitness News brand returned in July 1989 coinciding with the network relaunch, and it was later renamed as Ten Evening News in January 1990 and then as 10 News First in January 1991. In 1994, the Ten News brand was revived for the 2nd time. In September 2013, Ten once again revived the Eyewitness News branding for all its newscasts after a 19-year break.

In September 2020, studio production of the Queensland bulletin was transferred to Network 10's Sydney headquarters, leading to redundancies among presentation and production staff at the Brisbane studios.

Past news presenters

 Lachlan Kennedy (2015–2017)
 Bill McDonald (2003–2012)
 Marie-Louise Theile (1991–1993, 1997–2007)
 Juanita Phillips (1990–1993)
 Tracey Spicer (1994–1996)
 Bruce Paige (1990)
 Jacki MacDonald (1983)
 Kay McGrath (1981–1987)
 Des McWilliam
 Brian Cahill
 Tony Ryan
 Rob Readings
 Chris Collins
 Geoff Mullins
 David Jull
 Neville Roberts
 Robin Parkin
 Georgina Lewis (2007–2020)

Past sports reporters
 Michael Voss (2007–2008)
 Brad McEwan (2004–2006)
 Bill McDonald (1996–2003)

References

Ansett Australia
Network 10
Television stations in Brisbane
Television channels and stations established in 1965
1965 establishments in Australia